Tempelfjorden is a fjord branch at the inner end of Sassenfjorden, a part of Isfjorden at Spitsbergen, Svalbard. It is located between  Sabine Land and Bünsow Land. 

The fjord is named after the mountain Templet, which resembles a temple.

Between 2002 and 2015, the sailing vessel Noorderlicht was intentionally frozen into Tempelfjorden every winter.

References

Fjords of Spitsbergen